Boiga forsteni, also known as Forsten's cat snake, is a species of mildly venomous rear-fanged colubrid endemic to South Asia.

Geographic range
Boiga forstenii is found in Nepal, Sri Lanka, and India (Sikkim, West Bengal, Maharashtra, Gujarat, Kerala, Uttar Pradesh to Bihar, Madhya Pradesh, Orissa, Andhra Pradesh, Tamil Nadu, southern Rajasthan, Uttarakhand, and Jharkhand).

Etymology
The specific name, forstenii, is in honor of Dutch naturalist Eltio Alegondas Forsten (1811–1843).

Description
See snake scales for terms used
The anterior palatine and mandibular teeth are considerably larger than the others. The eye is about as long as its distance from the nostril.

The rostral scale is broader than it is deep and the internasals are much shorter than the prefrontals. The frontal is nearly as long as its distance from the end of the snout, which is shorter than the parietal scales. The loreal is square or deeper than it is long. There is one preocular scale, extending to the upper surface of the head, and two or three postoculars. The temporal scales are very small and numerous. There are eight to eleven upper labials, with the third, fourth and fifth, or the fourth fifth and sixth entering the eye. There are three or four lower labials, in contact with the anterior chin shields, which are about as long as the posterior. The ventral scales are 259 to 270, the anal entire and the subcaudals 106 to 131.

The body is laterally compressed. The dorsal scales are in 25 or 27 rows at midbody, disposed obliquely, and the vertebral row is feebly enlarged. It is brown above, with more or less regular angular black crossbars, with or without white spots between them. There is a black band from the frontal shield to the nape and another on each side behind the eye. The lower parts are white, uniform or spotted with brown.

Habitat
The preferred habitats of B. forsteni are lowland forests and agricultural areas.

Behavior
B. forsteni is nocturnal and arboreal.

Diet
B. forsteni preys on lizards, snakes, birds, bats, and rodents.

Venom
Like other species of the genus Boiga, B. forsteni possesses a mild venom.

Reproduction
B. forsteni is an oviparous species. Sexually mature females lay 5–10 eggs. In India the eggs are laid in August and September.

References

Further reading
Anderson J (1871). "On some Indian reptiles". Proc. Zool. Soc. London 1871: 149–211. (Dipsas forsteni, p. 187).
Boulenger GA (1896). Catalogue of the Snakes in the British Museum (Natural History). Volume III., Containing the Colubridæ (Opisthoglyphæ and Proteroglyphæ) ... London: Trustees of the British Museum (Natural History). (Taylor and Francis, printers). xiv + 727 pp. + Plates I-XXV. (Dipsadomorphus forsteni, p. 80).
Duméril A-M-C, Bibron G, Duméril A[-H-A] (1854). Erpétologie générale ou histoire naturelle complète des reptiles. Tome septième [Volume 7]. Deuxième partie. Comprenant l'histoire des serpents venimeux. Paris: Librairie Encyclopédique de Roret: xii + 781–1536. (Triglyphodon forsteni, new species, pp. 1077–1078). (in French).
Günther ACLG (1864). The Reptiles of British India. London: The Ray Society. (Taylor and Francis, printers). xxvii + 452 pp. + Plates I-XXVI. (Dipsas forsteni, p. 309).
Wall F (1921). Ophidia Taprobanica or the Snakes of Ceylon. Colombo, Ceylon [Sri Lanka]: Colombo Museum. (H.R. Cottle, Government Printer). xxii + 581 pp. (Dipsadomorphus forsteni, pp. 285–289).

External links
Photo

forsteni
Snakes of Asia
Snakes of India
Reptiles of Nepal
Reptiles of Sri Lanka
Reptiles described in 1854
Taxa named by André Marie Constant Duméril
Taxa named by Auguste Duméril
Taxa named by Gabriel Bibron